Luis Antonio Jiménez Camacaro (born May 7, 1982) is a Venezuelan professional baseball first baseman who is currently a free agent. He has played for the Seattle Mariners in Major League Baseball (MLB) and the Hokkaido Nippon-Ham Fighters in Nippon Professional Baseball (NPB). Jiménez throws and bats left-handed.

Playing career
Jimenez signed by the Oakland Athletics on January 18, Jiménez played for various minor league teams for the A's, Baltimore Orioles, Los Angeles Dodgers, and Minnesota Twins before being signed by the Boston Red Sox to a minor league contract on February 1, . With the Portland Sea Dogs in 2006, Jiménez hit 17 home runs and batted in 70 runs, with a .276 batting average. The Boston Red Sox organization re-signed him to a minor league contract on December 20, 2006, and invited him to participate in the Red Sox'  spring training. During the  season as a member of the Bowie Baysox, he hit 22 home runs while batting .328. On November 27, 2007, the Washington Nationals signed him to a minor league contract. He began the  season with the Double-A Harrisburg Senators and he became a free agent at the end of the season.

Hokkaido Nippon-Ham Fighters
Jiménez signed with the Hokkaido Nippon-Ham Fighters of Nippon Professional Baseball for the 2009 season. He became a free agent after the season.

Seattle Mariners
He was signed minor league contract with the Seattle Mariners in before 2011 Season. He was called up in September 2012, Jiménez hit no home runs and batted in no runs, with a .059 batting average.

Toronto Blue Jays
On December 11, 2012, the Toronto Blue Jays announced that Jiménez had been signed to a minor league contract with an invitation to major league spring training. Jiménez started the 2013 season with the Triple-A Buffalo Bisons. He was named International League 'Batter of the Week' for April 15 to 21. His week included 8 RBIs in one game.

Lotte Giants
Jiménez signed with the Lotte Giants of the KBO League for the 2014 season. He became a free agent following the season.

Diablos Rojos del México
On July 6, 2015, Jiménez signed with the Diablos Rojos del México of the Mexican Baseball League. He was released on April 2, 2017.

Guerreros de Oaxaca
On May 3, 2018, Jiménez signed with the Guerreros de Oaxaca of the Mexican Baseball League. He was released on July 3, 2018.

International career 
He was selected to the roster for the Venezuela national baseball team at the 2015 WBSC Premier12.

During the winter, Jiménez plays in the Venezuelan Professional Baseball League.

See also
 List of Major League Baseball players from Venezuela

References

External links
, or MiLB, or Retrosheet, or Seattle Times, or The News Tribune, or Pelota Binaria (Venezuelan Winter Leagues), or Washington Nationals website

1982 births
Living people
Aberdeen IronBirds players
Arizona League Athletics players
Bluefield Orioles players
Bowie Baysox players
Bravos de Margarita players
Buffalo Bisons (minor league) players
Cardenales de Lara players
Caribes de Anzoátegui players
Columbus Catfish players
Columbus Clippers players
Diablos Rojos del México players
Guerreros de Oaxaca players
Harrisburg Senators players
Hokkaido Nippon-Ham Fighters players
Jackson Generals (Southern League) players
KBO League first basemen
Lotte Giants players
Major League Baseball designated hitters
Major League Baseball players from Venezuela
Mexican League baseball first basemen
New Britain Rock Cats players
Nippon Professional Baseball infielders
Pawtucket Red Sox players
Sportspeople from Barquisimeto
Portland Sea Dogs players
Seattle Mariners players
Tacoma Rainiers players
Venezuela national baseball team players
Venezuelan expatriate baseball players in Japan
Venezuelan expatriate baseball players in Mexico
Venezuelan expatriate baseball players in South Korea
Venezuelan expatriate baseball players in the United States
2015 WBSC Premier12 players